The Ngmayem Festival is an annual harvest festival celebrated by the chiefs and peoples of Manya Krobo in the Eastern Region of Ghana. The festival was established by Nene Azu Mate Kole in 1944 to replace the already existing festival called "Yeliyem", which literary means 'eating of yam'. It is usually celebrated in the month of October in Dodowa and also the Shai in the towns of Somanya and Odumase. The festival is celebrated for one week, mostly from the last two Sundays of the month of October.

The festival 
The meaning of Ngmayem is ‘Eating the New Millet’ The festival is a commemoration of plentiful Harvest of Millet, which is called 'ngma' and it is a period in which the people of Manya Krobo give thanks to their creator for protection, and the plentiful harvest.

References 

Festivals in Ghana